Raitis is a Latvian masculine given name and may refer to:
Raitis Grafs (born 1981), Latvian basketball player 
Raitis Ivanāns (born 1979), Latvian ice hockey player
Raitis Puriņš (born 1988), Latvian handball player

References

Latvian masculine given names